Sombrero Key Light is located offshore of Vaca Key in Marathon, Florida. The lighthouse is located on a mostly submerged reef. The name Sombrero Key goes back to the Spanish, and old charts show a small island at the spot, but by the later 19th Century the island had eroded away, with some parts of the reef exposed at low tide. As a result, the reef and the lighthouse have also been called Dry Banks.

The lighthouse was put in service in 1858, automated in 1960, and was deactivated in 2015. The foundation is iron pilings with disks, and the tower is a skeletal octagonal pyramid of cast iron. It has two platforms. The original lens, a first-order Fresnel lens, is now on display in the Key West Lighthouse Museum. The Sombrero Key Light is the tallest lighthouse in the Florida Keys, and was the last lighthouse constructed under the supervision of Lieutenant George Meade of the Bureau of Topographical Engineers.

Keepers

 Joseph Bethel 1858 – 1859
 Joseph F. Papy 1859 – 1860
 Anthony Davis 1860 – 1862
 James Bryson 1862 – 1864
 John H. Singleton 1864 – 1866
 John Carroll 1866 – 1870
 Peter Crocker 1870 – 1872
 Adolphus A. Seymour 1872 – 1873
 Jeremiah Buckley 1873 – 1881
 Thomas J. Pinder 1881 – 1884
 Melville Evans Spencer 1884 – 1889
 Rudolph Rieke 1889 – 1904
 John Watkins 1904 – 1913
 Miguel Fabal 1913 – 1919
 William H. Pierce 1919 – at least 1933
 Edward P. Johnson 1936 – 1941
 Furman C. Williamson 1958 –1960

Availability
On February 1, 2019 it was announced that the lighthouse would be given away freely to any government agencies, educational agencies, non-profit corporations, or any community development organizations who wanted to use it for "educational, park, recreational, cultural or historic preservation purposes."  This is in accordance with the National Historic Lighthouse Preservation Act. If none request it, then it will be auctioned off to anyone else who does.

On February 13, 2022 the lighthouse was listed for auction on GSAAuctions.gov with an opening bid of $15,000. On May 16, 2022 the lighthouse was sold for $575,000.

Notes

Further reading
McCarthy, Kevin M. 1990. Cape Florida Lighthouse. Florida Lighthouses. (pp. 41–44). University of Florida Press.

External links

Lighthouses completed in 1858
Lighthouses in Monroe County, Florida
National Register of Historic Places in Monroe County, Florida
Lighthouses on the National Register of Historic Places in Florida
1858 establishments in Florida